"Call If You Need Me" is a 2018 song by Australian singer-songwriter Vance Joy.

Call If You Need Me may also refer to:

 "Call If You Need Me", a song by Swedish electronic music duo Galantis from the 2015 album Pharmacy
 "Call If You Need Me", a song by Canadian independent rock band The Wooden Sky from the 2009 album If I Don't Come Home You'll Know I'm Gone
 "Call If You Need Me", a 2012 song by Jen Cloher with Kieran Ryan from the EP Baby We Were Born to Die
 Call If You Need Me, a 2009 feature film by Malaysian film company Da Huang Pictures 
 Call If You Need Me: The Uncollected Fiction and Other Prose, a 2001 collection of works by Raymond Carver